Thiorhodococcus kakinadensis is a Gram-negative and motile bacterium from the genus of Thiorhodococcus.

References 

Chromatiales
Bacteria described in 2007